Analogic is an American multinational corporation that provides health care and security technology products.

History
Analogic Corporation was founded by Bernard M. Gordon in 1967.

The company opened a manufacturing facility in Shanghai, China, in December 2009.

Analogic Corporation was acquired in 2018 by an affiliate of private equity firm Altaris Capital Partners.

Company

As of April 2018, the company employs 1,500 employees worldwide with approximately 800 working at the main facility and headquarters in Peabody, Massachusetts.

Jim Green, who had been CEO for nine years, stepped down from his position in 2016. He was succeeded by Fred B. Parks. Tom Ripp is the current CEO.

Analogic was included in Electronic Design's list for the Top 50 Employers in Electronic Design in 2012. It was also selected by the Boston Globe as one of the top 100 companies in Massachusetts in 2013.

Acquisitions 

Ultrasonix Medical Corporation

Ultrasonix Medical Corporation was a Vancouver, Canada-based sonography equipment company founded in 2000 which Analogic acquired in 2013 as a strategic expansion of its own ultrasound imaging product line and customer base, including an installed base of 5,000 systems globally. At the time of its acquisition, Ultrasonix had at least two manufacturing plants, in Englewood, Colorado and Vancouver, British Columbia, both of which were closed following the acquisition.

Copley Controls

In 2008, Analogic acquired Copley Controls, a Canton, Mass.-based supplier of gradient amplifiers for MRI Systems.

Products
Analogic provides imaging systems and technology that enable computed tomography (CT), digital mammography, and magnetic resonance imaging (MRI). The company's CT, MRI, and digital mammography products are sold to original equipment manufacturers (OEMs).

References 

Electronics companies of the United States
Companies based in Peabody, Massachusetts
American companies established in 1967
1967 establishments in Massachusetts
Companies formerly listed on the Nasdaq